Józef Kos (27 September 1900 in Bącz – 5 April 2007 in Sierakowice) was one of the last surviving veterans of the First World War and one of the oldest people in Poland at the time of his death. He was an ethnic Kashubian. In 1918 he served for the German Empire in the German Army during the last year of the war.

In Kashubia Kos attended a German language school when he was a child living in the small village of Bontsch (Bącz) (near Karthaus (Kartuzy)). In this time it was in West Prussia, part of the German Empire.

In summer 1918, just before Kos turned 18 years old, the German Army sent him to train in Rastenburg (Kętrzyn) in East Prussia. He and the other troops trained for three months before they began a march to Belgium, which was on Germany's western front, in order to deploy to the English Channel. After many weeks of marching at 40 kilometers per day, the war ended before reaching their destination. On his journey back to Poland, he witnessed the chaos in Germany as the country went through revolution and people stealing food just to have something to eat. He and other troops were given the opportunity to serve as border guards in the city of Danzig (Gdańsk), which eventually became a free city after the war, but he declined the offer and went home.

In 1920 Kos was a volunteer for Poland in the Polish-Soviet War, which secured Poland's independence.

When Germany invaded Poland in September 1939, Kos was one of many Polish men that were rounded up and sent to Stalag XIII-D Nuremberg-Langwasser, which was a prisoner-of-war camp used by Germany and located in Nuremberg. He was interned for a month and a half, at which time the civilians from Kashubia were released. His wife and two daughters were waiting to greet him at the train station in Sierakowice, Poland, when he arrived back home.

Kos started learning his trade as a shoemaker when he was 14 years old, and retired in 1965. He enjoyed bee-keeping after his retirement, and some people credited his longevity to his daily healthy consumption of honey.

Kos married his wife Agnieszka née Jelinski in 1935, and they had 5 daughters, and at the time of his death 7 grandchildren and 12 great-grandchildren. Before he married, as a bachelor, Kos bought a home in Sierakowice that he would live in for the rest of his life.

Kos died after several weeks of illness at the age of 106, just a few days before Easter. Services were delayed until after Easter, in order to allow for the many interested people to view his coffin, which was displayed at the St. Marcin's Church in Sierakowice.

References
 Józef Kos biography and 104th birthday, Wiadomosci Sierakowickie (Polish News)
 Józef Kos biography and 105th birthday, Wiadomosci Sierakowickie (Polish News)
 Józef Kos 106th birthday, Wiadomosci Sierakowickie (Polish News)
 Józef Kos death notice and biography, Wiadomosci Sierakowickie (Polish News)
 Józef Kos death notice and biography, Kartuzy.info (Polish News)
 Józef Kos death notice, Express Kaszubski (Polish News)

1900 births
2007 deaths
People from Kartuzy County
German Army personnel of World War I
People from West Prussia
Polish centenarians
Men centenarians
Polish people of World War I
Kashubians